The Summer Sanitarium Tour was a music event led by American heavy metal band Metallica. The first edition took place during the summer of 2000, with 20 shows in the United States. A second edition was held during the summer of 2003, with 21 shows in North America. The tour was sponsored by MTV and Mars Music and promoted by SFX Concerts.

Background
It marks the final tour for bassist Jason Newsted, who quit the band in January 2001. Before the concert in Atlanta on July 7, 2000, frontman James Hetfield injured his back in a jet skiing accident and was forced to sit out three shows. Newsted sang most of the songs during these concerts, and the vocals and rhythm guitar were also taken by musicians from the supporting acts, such as Kid Rock and his guitarists Kenny Olson and Jason Krause, Serj Tankian and Daron Malakian of System of a Down, and Jonathan Davis of Korn.

The tour grossed $42 million in 2000 and $48.8 million in 2003.

Support acts

2000
Korn
Kid Rock
Powerman 5000
System of a Down
Karma to Burn

2003
Limp Bizkit
Linkin Park
Deftones
Mudvayne

Setlist
The following setlist was obtained from the concert held on July 12, 2000; at the Mile High Stadium in Denver, Colorado. It does not represent all concerts for the duration of the tour.
"Creeping Death"
"For Whom the Bell Tolls"
"Seek & Destroy"
"Fade to Black"
"Fuel"
"Whiplash"
"Sad but True"
"No Leaf Clover"
"King Nothing"
"Master of Puppets" / "Welcome Home (Sanitarium)"
"Battery"
Encore
"Nothing Else Matters"
"One"
"Turn the Page"
"Enter Sandman"

Tour dates

Festivals and other miscellaneous performances
This concert is a part of the "Experience Music Project Opening Celebration"
This concert is a part of the "MGD Blind Date"
This concert is a part of "Tattoo the Earth"
This concert is a part of "Rockfest"

Box office score data

References

Metallica concert tours
2000 concert tours
2003 concert tours